Paul Émile de Puydt (6 March 1810 – 20 May 1891), a writer whose contributions included work in botany and economics, was born and died in Mons, Belgium. His father was Jean Ambroise de Puydt (1758–1836), who was governor of the province Hainaut in the early days of Belgium from 1830 till 1834. In the first marriage of his father there were 6 children. The famous Remi de Puydt came from this first marriage. He is a half brother of Paul Émile de Puydt. Remi de Puydt was a civil engineer and a politician (representative), and he served in the Belgian army as a colonel.

Biography
Paul-Émile was the second child of four children from the second marriage of his father, who married in 1799 Marie Adélaïde Jeanne Michot (c. 1777 – 1858). As a botanist, Paul Émile de Puydt notably wrote on orchids. The standard botanical author abbreviation De Puydt is applied to species he described.

After his studies, he turned to journalism and worked as an editor of "L'Observateur du Hainaut". 
Together with Henri-Florent Delmotte and Hippolyte Rousselle, he wrote in 1831, the year when the current Belgium became separated from the northern Netherlands, the theatre piece "Le candidat à la royauté: esquisse en trois tableaux mêlés de couplets". This play was performed in Mons in 1831. 
He then participated in the government, and he was also director of the Mont-de-piété of Mons.

In his free time he was interested in botany, and he developed a pronounced interest in orchids.
Since 1831 he was secretary of the founded societé d'horticulture de Mons. In 1833 he worked on the foundation of the Societé des arts et des lettres du Hainaut, where he was vice-president and, from 1865 onwards, president.

Paul-Émile de Puydt married in 1841 Fanie Catherine Cousin (1819–1905). They had two children: Julien-Vincent-Émile de Puydt (1842–1921) and Philippine-Therese-Marie de Puydt (1843–1892).

As a political economist, he is known as inventor of the concept of people having the freedom to choose which government to join, and governments having to compete for citizens. He has given the name panarchy to this concept. His paper "Panarchie" was first published in French in the Revue Trimestrielle, in Brussels, July 1860.  Panarchie and its author Paul Emile de Puydt was only recently rediscovered.
The notion of competitive government, but then limited to defence, can also be found in the writings of the Belgian economist Gustave de Molinari from 1849, eleven years before de Puydt.
David Hart of the Department of History of Stanford University suggests that Paul-Émile de Puydt might have been influenced by the works of his fellow countryman Gustave de Molinari.

Panarchy 
In an 1860 article, de Puydt first proposed the idea of panarchy: a political philosophy that emphasizes each individual's right to freely choose (join and leave) the jurisdiction of any governments they choose, without being forced to move from their current locale. A proponent of laissez-faire economics, he wrote that "governmental competition" would let "as many regularly competing governments as have ever been conceived and will ever be invented" exist simultaneously and detailed how such a system would be implemented. As David M. Hart writes: "Governments would become political churches, only having jurisdiction over their congregations who had elected to become members." Three similar ideas are "Functional Overlapping Competing Jurisdictions" (FOCJ) advocated by Swiss economists Bruno Frey and Reiner Eichenberger, "multigovernment" advocated by Le Grand E. Day and others, and "meta-utopia" from Robert Nozick's Anarchy, State, and Utopia.

Works

Botany 
 Traité théorique et pratique de la culture des plantes de serre froide, orangerie et serre tempérées des jardiniers, précédé de notions pratiques de physiologie végétale et de physique horticole, et de conseils pour la construction des différentes serres. 1860
 Les Poires de Mons. 1860

 Les Plantes de serre, traité théorique et pratique de la culture de toutes les plantes qui demandent un abri sous le climat de la Belgique. 2 vols, 1866
 Les Orchidées, histoire iconographique, organographie, classification, géographie, collections, commerce, emploi, culture, avec une revue descriptive des espèces cultivées en Europe. Ouvrage orné de 244 vignettes et de 50 chromo-lithographies, dessinées d'après nature sous la direction de M. Leroy, dans les serres de M. Guibert,1880

Social sciences 
  Panarchy, first published in French in the Revue Trimestrielle, Bruxelles, July 1860, page 222 to 245
 https://books.google.com/books?id=8SIWAAAAYAAJ
 La Charité et les institutions de bienfaisance. 1867
 Marche et progrès de la civilisation dans les temps modernes. 1870
 La Grève. 1876
 La Littérature et les Arts, dans leurs rapports avec la morale. SOCIÉTÉ DES SCIENCES, DES ARTS ET DES LETTRES DU HAINAUT. TROISIÈME SÉRIE. TOME SEPTIÈME. ANNÉE 1871–1872.

Novels 
 Chevreuse, roman. 1859
 Maudit métier, histoire du Borinage. 1883
 Cent mille francs de dot. 1890

Other publications
 Biography of his father:
Biographie de M. Jean-Ambroise De Puydt. 60 p.SOCIÉTÉ DES SCIENCES, DES ARTS ET DES LETTRES DU HAINAUT. TROISIÈME SÉRIE. TOME HUITIÈME. ANNÉE 1872.
 Theatre piece:  
„Le candidat à la royauté: esquisse en trois tableaux mêlés de couplets“ par Henri-Florent Delmotte, Paul Émile de Puydt, Hippolyte Rousselle, 1831

Literature 
 Léopold Devillers: Puydt (Paul-Émile de). In: Académie Royale des Sciences, des Lettres et des Beaux-Arts de Belgique: Biographie nationale. Bd. 18, Brüssel 1905.
 C. Rousselle: Puydt (de) Paul-Émile. In: Ernest A. Matthieu: Biographie du Hainaut. Bd. 2, Enghien 1903.
 J-F. de Montigny, Tijdschrift van de Antwerpse kring voor familiekunde, Jaargang IX, 1954, p100-115

References

External links
 

1810 births
1891 deaths
19th-century Belgian botanists
Belgian economists
Belgian writers in French
Botanists with author abbreviations
People from Mons
Walloon people